Koripally Muthyam Reddy  was an Indian politician and Member of the Legislative Assembly during the 1st Assembly of Andhra Pradesh from 1957 to 1962.

Political career 
Muthiam Reddy was Member of the Legislative Assembly for one term from 1957 to 1962 from Nirmal. He contested as an independent candidate and defeated P. Narsa Reddy  of the Indian National Congress political party.

Posts held

See also 

 Andhra Pradesh Legislative Assembly
 Government of India
 Nirmal (Assembly constituency)
 Politics of India

References 

Indian National Congress politicians from Andhra Pradesh
People from Adilabad district
Members of the Andhra Pradesh Legislative Council
Date of birth missing
Date of birth unknown
1982 deaths